Taryanche Bait is a 2011 Marathi film directed by Kiran Yadnyopavit starring Sachin Khedekar, Vinay Apte, Ashwini Giri and Ashmita Joglekar in lead roles.

Cast
 Vinay Apte
Ashwini Giri
Ashmita Joglekar as Meera
Kishore Kadam
 Sachin Khedekar
Shashank Shende as Mahadaa
Ishaan Tambe as Omkar
Bhushan Mehare as Vithal

Reception
Taryanche Bait received positive reviews from critics. Marathimovieworld gave the film a positive review saying, "'Taryanche Bait' - reminds about values,Thanks to Kiran Yadnyopavit, Neeraj Pande and Ekta Kapoor for such a wonderful offering" and praise acting talent of Sachin Khedkar as a father in the film.

The Indian Express gave the film a 3 star rating out of 5 praising Ektaa's effort in Marathi film industry saying, "Ekta Kapoor of Motion Pictures forays into Marathi cinema and we hope she continues to make many more such films."

Awards

References

External links

Films set in Mumbai
2010s Marathi-language films
Balaji Motion Pictures films